Christopher Louis Colclough (10 July 1946 – 28 June 2017) was a British development economist and academic, who specialised in education in developing countries.

Colclough was director, Centre for Education and International Development, and Commonwealth Professor of Education and Development, Faculty of Education, University of Cambridge. He also was a life fellow of Corpus Christi College, Cambridge.

Following a series of gifts and bequests from Professor Colclough, Corpus Christi College, Cambridge instituted a Christopher Colclough Studentship to support students of the college undertaking graduate studies in the humanities and social sciences.

References

1946 births
2017 deaths
British development economists
Academics of the University of Cambridge